Ashley Westwood may refer to:
Ashley Westwood (footballer, born 1976), English footballer and manager
Ashley Westwood (footballer, born 1990), English footballer

Human name disambiguation pages